This tournament is sponsored by Unique apparels. 14 teams are participated in two groups.

Teams

References
 http://www.srilankafootball.com/division1.html 

2010–11 in Sri Lankan football
Sri Lanka